Olds Peak is a peak (1,480 m) standing 6 nautical miles (11 km) northeast of Mount Kenney in the south part of Longhorn Spurs, Queen Maud Mountains. Named by Advisory Committee on Antarctic Names (US-ACAN) for Commander Corwin A. Olds, U.S. Navy, who participated in Antarctic Support Activity during U.S. Navy Operation Deepfreeze 1964.

Mountains of the Ross Dependency
Dufek Coast